Spilosoma is a genus of moths in the family Erebidae originally described by John Curtis in 1825. A very heterogeneous group, it is in need of review by the scientific community, as certain species probably need reclassification into their own genera.

Description
Palpi short, porrect (extending forward) and fringed with hair. Antennae bipectinate (comb like on both sides) in male and serrate in female. Mid tibia with a terminal pair of minute spurs and hind tibia with two spur pairs. Forewings are rather long and narrow. Veins 3 to 5 from angle of cell. Vein 6 from upper angle and veins 7 to 10 are stalked. Hindwings with veins 3 to 5 from angle of cell. Veins 6 and 7 from upper angle. Vein 8 from middle of cell. Female with an abdominal tuft developed in most cases.

Species more or less related to the type species
 Spilosoma congrua Walker, 1855 – agreeable tiger moth, white-bodied estigmene
 Spilosoma daitoensis Matsumura, 1930
 Spilosoma dubia (Walker, 1855) – dubious tiger moth
 Spilosoma ericsoni (Semper, 1899)
 Spilosoma erythrozona (Kollar, [1844])
 Spilosoma extrema Daniel, 1943
 Spilosoma fujianensis Fang, 1981
 Spilosoma inexpectata Rothschild, 1933
 Spilosoma latipennis Stretch, 1872 – pink-legged tiger moth, red-legged diacrisia
 Spilosoma likiangensis Daniel, 1943
 Spilosoma lubricipeda (Linnaeus, 1758) – white ermine
 Spilosoma lutea (Hufnagel, 1766) – buff ermine
 Spilosoma ningyuenfui Daniel, 1943
 Spilosoma pelopea (Druce, 1897)
 Spilosoma punctaria (Stoll, [1782])
 Spilosoma reticulata Rothschild, 1933
 Spilosoma rostagnoi Oberthür, 1911
 Spilosoma rubidus (Leech, 1890)
 Spilosoma semialbescens Talbot, 1929
 Spilosoma urticae (Esper, 1789) – water ermine
 Spilosoma vestalis Packard, 1864 – vestal tiger-moth
 Spilosoma virginica Fabricius, 1798 – Virginia tiger moth
 Spilosoma yemenensis (Hampson, 1916)

Erythrophleps species group
 Spilosoma ignivagans Rothschild, 1919
 Spilosoma erythrophleps Hampson, 1894

Subgenus Rhagonis Walker, 1862 or a separate genus
 Spilosoma danbyi (Neumögen & Dyar, 1893) – Danby's tiger moth
 Spilosoma pteridis H. Edwards, 1875 – brown tiger moth
 Spilosoma vagans (Boisduval, 1852) – wandering tiger moth

Subgenus Rhodareas Kirby, 1892
 Spilosoma melanopsis (Walker, [1865] 1864)

Spilosoma sensu lato species not congeneric to the type species
 Spilosoma albiventre Kiriakoff, 1963
 Spilosoma atrivenata Rothschild, 1933
 Spilosoma batesi (Rothschild, 1910)
 Spilosoma baxteri (Rothschild, 1910)
 Spilosoma bipartita Rothschild, 1933
 Spilosoma brunneomixta Toulgoët, 1971
 Spilosoma buryi (Rothschild, 1910)
 Spilosoma castelli Rothschild, 1933
 Spilosoma crossi (Rothschild, 1910)
 Spilosoma curvilinea Walker, 1855
 Spilosoma dufranei Kiriakoff, 1965
 Spilosoma feifensis Wiltshire, 1986
 Spilosoma flavidior Gaede, 1923
 Spilosoma gynephaea (Hampson, 1901)
 Spilosoma hercules (Toulgoët, 1956)
 Spilosoma heterogenea Bartel, 1903
 Spilosoma holoxantha (Hampson, 1907)
 Spilosoma immaculata Bartel, 1903
 Spilosoma jordani Debauche, 1938
 Spilosoma jussiaeae (Poey, 1832)
 Spilosoma karschi Bartel, 1903
 Spilosoma latiradiata (Hampson, 1901)
 Spilosoma maniemae Kiriakoff, 1965
 Spilosoma mediocinerea (Toulgoët, 1956)
 Spilosoma mediopunctata (Pagenstecher, 1903)
 Spilosoma melanimon Mabille, 1880
 Spilosoma nigrocastanea (Rothschild, 1917)
 Spilosoma nigrocincta (Kenrick, 1914)
 Spilosoma nyasana Rothschild, 1933
 Spilosoma occidens (Rothschild, 1910)
 Spilosoma pales (Druce, 1910)
 Spilosoma pauliani (Toulgoët, 1956)
 Spilosoma pellucida (Rothschild, 1910)
 Spilosoma penultimum Kiriakoff, 1965
 Spilosoma pseudambrensis (Toulgoët, 1961)
 Spilosoma quadrimacula Toulgoët, 1977
 Spilosoma rava (Druce, 1898)
 Spilosoma tenuivena Kiriakoff, 1965
 Spilosoma togoensis Bartel, 1903
 Spilosoma turlini Toulgoët, 1973

Species of unclear status
 Spilosoma alberti (Rothschild, 1914)
 Spilosoma alticola Rogenhofer, 1891
 Spilosoma cajetani Rothschild, 1910
 Spilosoma clasnaumanni Kühne, 2005
 Spilosoma clava (Wileman, 1910)
 Spilosoma eldorado (Rothschild, 1910)
 Spilosoma euryphlebia (Hampson, 1903)
 Spilosoma fraterna (Rothschild, 1910)
 Spilosoma fumida (Wileman, 1910)
 Spilosoma fuscipennis Hampson, 1894
 Spilosoma fusifrons Walker, [1865]
 Spilosoma metaleuca (Hampson, 1905)
 Spilosoma obliqua (Walker, 1855)
 Spilosoma roseata (Rothschild, 1910)
 Spilosoma sagittifera Moore, 1888
 Spilosoma semperi (Rothschild, 1910)
 Spilosoma sumatrana (Swinhoe, 1905)
 Spilosoma virgulae Černý, 2011
 Spilosoma wahri Rothschild, 1933
 Spilosoma wildi De Vos, 2013
 Spilosoma wilemani (Rothschild, 1914)
 Spilosoma withaari De Vos, 2013

Species separated into Ardices
 Spilosoma canescens Butler, 1875 – dark-spotted tiger moth
 Spilosoma curvata Donovan, 1805 – crimson tiger moth
 Spilosoma glatignyi (Le Guillou, 1841) – black and white tiger moth

Species separated into Toulgarctia
 Spilosoma griveaudi (Toulgoët, 1957)
 Spilosoma luteoradians (Toulgoët, 1954)
 Spilosoma milloti (Toulgoët, 1954)
 Spilosoma viettei (Toulgoët, 1954)
 Spilosoma vieui (Toulgoët, 1957)

References

External links
 
 

 
Spilosomina
Moth genera